Abdulaziz bin Abdullah Al-Sheikh ( ʿAbd al-ʿAzīz ibn ʿAbd Āllah Āl ash-Sheikh; born 30 November 1940) is a Saudi Arabian Islamic scholar who is the current Grand Mufti of Saudi Arabia. As such he is head of the Council of Senior Religious Scholars and its sub-committee, the Permanent Committee for Islamic Research and Issuing Fatwas.

Biography
Sheikh Abdulaziz Al Sheikh is a member of the Al ash-Sheikh family. In 1969-70 he assumed leadership at the Sheikh Muhammad Bin Ibrahim Mosque in Dukhna, Riyadh. In 1979 he was appointed assistant professor at the College of Sharia, Mecca.

In June 1999, Al Sheikh was appointed Grand Mufti of Saudi Arabia by King Fahd, following the death of Grand Mufti Abdulaziz Bin Baz.

Proclamations
Following Pope Benedict XVI's quotation of a Byzantine emperor in a lecture, the Grand Mufti called the pope's statement "lies", adding that they "show that reconciliation between religions is impossible".

In 2007, the Grand Mufti announced plans to demolish the Green Dome and flatten the dome.

On 15 March 2012, the Grand Mufti declared that, "All churches in the Arabian Peninsula must be destroyed". This declaration caused criticism from some Christian officeholders. Roman Catholic bishops in Germany and Austria responded sharply to his fatwa, concerned about the human rights of non-Muslims working in the Persian Gulf region. Russian Orthodox Metropolitan Mark, Archbishop of Yegoryevsk, said the ruling was "alarming". Most of the world overlooked the statement. Mehmet Görmez, the most senior imam in Turkey, blasted Al Sheikh's call to "destroy all the churches" in the Persian Gulf region, saying that the announcement totally contradicted the peaceful teachings of Islam. Görmez, the president of Diyanet İşleri Başkanlığı (Presidency of Religious Affairs), said he could not accept Al Sheikh's fatwa, adding that it ran contrary to the centuries-old Islamic teachings of tolerance and the sanctity of institutions belonging to other religions.

In April 2012, the Grand Mufti issued a fatwa allowing ten-year-old girls to marry insisting that girls are ready for marriage by age 10 or 12: "Our mothers and grandmothers got married when they were barely 12. Good upbringing makes a girl ready to perform all marital duties at that age." However, he is opposed to the practice of marrying off very young girls to older men, emphasizing its incongruence with Islamic tradition.

In June 2013, Al Sheikh issued a fatwa demanding the destruction of statues of horses placed in a roundabout in Jizan: "The sculptures [must] be removed because they are a great sin and are prohibited under Sharia".

The Grand Mufti issued a fatwa on 12 September 2013 that suicide bombings are "great crimes" and bombers are "criminals who rush themselves to hell by their actions". He described suicide bombers as "robbed of their minds... who have been used (as tools) to destroy themselves and societies."

In late August 2014, the Grand Mufti condemned the Islamic State of Iraq and the Levant and al-Qaeda saying, "Extremist and militant ideas and terrorism which spread decay on Earth, destroying human civilisation, are not in any way part of Islam, but are enemy number one of Islam, and Muslims are their first victims".

On 25 September 2015, one day after the Mina crowd crush disaster which (according to the Associated Press) killed at least 1,399 foreign Muslims performing Hajj, Al Sheikh publicly told Muhammad bin Nayef, then-Crown Prince of Saudi Arabia, that he was "not responsible for what happened", and "as for the things that humans cannot control, you are not blamed for them. Fate and destiny are inevitable." Prince Muhammad was also the country's interior minister, responsible for safety in Mecca, and the Grand Mufti's words immunized the Crown Prince from possible public criticism within Saudi Arabia, which set the official death toll for the Mina tragedy at fewer than 800 deaths.

In January 2016, while answering a question on a television show in which he issues fatwas in response to viewers' queries on everyday religious matters, Al Sheikh ruled that chess was forbidden in Islam because it constituted gambling, was a waste of time and money and a cause of hatred and enmity between the players.

In September 2016, the Grand Mufti ruled that the Iranian Leadership is not Muslim and is the "son of the magi". The Grand Mufti was on a list of religious scholars included on a death list by ISIS.

In November 2017, the Grand Mufti made a fatwa calling Hamas a terrorist organisation and stating that fighting against Jews is forbidden for Muslims. In response, Israel's Communications Minister Ayoub Kara, praised this religious ruling and invited him to visit Israel.

See also

 Destruction of early Islamic heritage sites in Saudi Arabia

References

External links

 http://alifta.com/Fatawa/MoftyDetails.aspx?languagename=en&ID=8 

Living people
Blind academics
Saudi Arabian imams
Saudi Arabian Sunni Muslim scholars of Islam
20th-century imams
21st-century imams
Salafi Quietists
Saudi Arabian Quran reciters
Saudi Arabian Salafis
Grand Muftis of Saudi Arabia
1943 births